Sympistis deceptiva is a species of moth in the family Noctuidae (the owlet moths). It was first described by William Barnes and Arthur Ward Lindsey in 1922 and it is found in North America.

The MONA or Hodges number for Sympistis deceptiva is 10088.

References

Further reading

 
 
 

deceptiva
Articles created by Qbugbot
Moths described in 1922